The Residence of Gurun Princess Kejing is a Qing dynasty courtyard house in Inner Mongolia, China. It currently houses the Hohhot Municipal Museum. It is listed as a Major Historical and Cultural Site Protected at the National Level.

History
The mansion was where Gurun Princess Kejing lived after her marriage to a member of the Mongolian Borjigin clan. The Dzungar–Qing Wars meant that the territory now known as Mongolia was unsafe for a Qing princess, so the Kangxi Emperor decreed that she should reside in Hohhot, then known as Guihua City. The site for the residence was selected in 1703, and all materials and labour for its construction came from the area surrounding Hohhot. The residence was completed in 1705.

The residence was occupied by descendants of Gurun Princess Kejing until the 20th century. In 1923, it was taken over and used by Hohhot Municipal Normal School. The Hohhot Museum acquired the complex in 1990.

In 2001, the complex was listed as a Major Historical and Cultural Site Protected at the National Level by the State Administration of Cultural Heritage.

Structure
The residential complex measures 180m from north to south, 63m from east to west. It is laid out symmetrically east-west, with the central axis from south to north featuring a spirit screen, main entrance, ceremonial entrance, main hall (called Jingyi Tang 靜宜堂), a house-style passage, bedchamber, and a rear building. Each of the four internal courtyards and buildings along the central axis is flanked by opposing side buildings.

The building is only one storey high and the walls are very thick to protect against the cold winters experienced in Hohhot. The main hall has traditional latticed windows, whilst the bedchamber has windows set high into the wall that can be opened.

Gallery

References

Notes

Works cited

Houses completed in 1705
Major National Historical and Cultural Sites in Inner Mongolia
Buildings and structures in Hohhot
Museums in Inner Mongolia
Tourist attractions in Inner Mongolia